A. occultus may refer to:
 Arion occultus, a small air-breathing land slug species
 Anolis occultus, a lizard species
 Antrodiaetus occultus, a floor trapping spider species in the genus Anthrodiaetus and the family Antrodiaetidae
 Aprostocetus occultus, an insect in the genus Aprostocetus

See also
 Occultus (disambiguation)